Anthony Barnett (born November 1942) is a modern English writer and campaigner. He was a co-founder of openDemocracy in 2001.

Biography
Barnett was a student at Cambridge University, where he was active in the Labour Club, and lodged with Nicholas Kaldor.

A former member of the editorial committee of New Left Review, Barnett has written for the New Statesman, The Guardian and Prospect. He conceived the television film England's Henry Moore (1988), which concerned the sculptor's co-option by the British establishment.

He was the first Director of Charter 88 from 1988 to 1995 and Co-Director of the Convention on Modern Liberty (2008–2009) with Henry Porter.

In 2001 he founded openDemocracy with Paul Hilder, Susie Richards and David Hayes and was its Editor and then its Editor-in-Chief until 2007. He remains a regular contributor to the website. In 2016, he serialised Blimey it could be Brexit! publishing a chapter a week in the run up to Britain's EU referendum about the forces behind the vote. His in-depth evaluation was announced to be published by Unbound in 2017 (What Next: Britain after Brexit). The title was changed to The Lure of Greatness: England’s Brexit and America’s Trump. In 2022 he published Taking Control! Humanity and America after Trump and the Pandemic with Repeater Books, on the possibilities of a progressive future. 

Barnett was awarded an honorary doctorate from The Open University in September 2013, and an honorary doctorate from Goldsmiths University in 2019.(Higher education should be about love and justice). He lives with Judith Herrin; the couple have two daughters, the singer Tamara Barnett-Herrin and Portia Barnett-Herrin.

Barnett has endorsed Joe Biden for re-election in the 2024 U.S. Presidential election, stating that he does not believe Joe Biden to be a racist, as opposed to Donald Trump, who Barnett has referred to as a "fascist." Citing Biden's enthusiastic appointment of Ketanji Brown Jackson to the United States Supreme Court, Barnett opines "[he believes] Biden [supports] integration" and thus deserves a second term.

Bibliography

Iron Britannia, Why Parliament Waged its Falklands War (1982) 
Soviet Freedom (1988) 
Debating the Constitution (1992) with Caroline Ellis and Paul Hirst 
Power and the Throne (1994), drawn from the Charter 88 monarchy debate 
This Time - Our Constitutional Revolution (1997) 
Town and Country (1999) edited with Roger Scruton 
The Athenian Option, Radical reform of the House of Lords with Peter Cary (2008) 
The Lure of Greatness: England's Brexit and America's Trump (2017) 
Taking Control!: Humanity and America After Trump and the Pandemic (2022)

Essays and reporting

 Introduction to 'Architect or Bee?' by Mike Cooley published by Hogarth Press in 1987;

References

External links
Journalisted - Articles by Anthony Barnett
Convention on Modern Liberty.

1942 births
Living people
British male journalists
British writers
The New York Review of Books people